Same-sex marriage in Maine has been legally recognized since December 29, 2012. A bill for the legalization of same-sex marriages was approved by voters, 53–47 percent, on November 6, 2012, as Maine, Maryland and Washington became the first U.S. states to legalize same-sex marriage by popular vote. Election results were certified by the Maine Secretary of State's office and the Governor of Maine, Paul LePage, on November 29.

The 2012 referendum was a reversal of action on a similar bill three years earlier. On May 6, 2009, a bill to allow same-sex marriage in Maine was signed into law by Governor John Baldacci following legislative approval. Opponents of the bill successfully petitioned for a referendum before the law went into effect; voters rejected the law on November 3, 2009 in a "people's veto". Until the referendum result rejected the law, it appeared that Maine would be the first U.S. state to legalize same-sex marriage through the legislative process with a governor's signature, rather than following a judicial ruling. Vermont was the first state to legalize same-sex marriage by statute, but its legislature did so by overriding its governor's veto.

Both U.S senators from Maine, Republican Susan Collins and Independent Angus King, support same-sex marriage.

Domestic partnerships

In 2004, Maine established domestic partnerships, which provide some of the legal rights and benefits of marriage. A domestic partnership grants the couple, opposite-sex or same-sex, inheritance rights, domestic violence protection, and the right to make medical decisions, among others. The legislation was passed by the Maine Legislature and signed into law by Governor John Baldacci on April 28, 2004. It took effect on July 30, 2004.

Same-sex marriage

1997 legislation 
I.P. 1 - L.D. 1017, An Act to Protect Traditional Marriage and Prohibit Same Sex Marriages, was passed on March 28, 1997. On March 27, the House voted 106–39 in favor followed by the Senate the following day, which voted for the bill 24–10. The bill would have gone to a referendum if it had been rejected by either Governor Angus King or the Maine Legislature, since the bill was initiated by referendum. The law was repealed in 2012.

2009 legislation 
In January 2009, Senator Dennis Damon introduced a bill titled An Act To End Discrimination in Civil Marriage and Affirm Religious Freedom to allow same-sex couples to marry in Maine. A public hearing took place on April 22 at the Augusta Civic Center because of high levels of interest. The legislation extended the right to refuse to perform same-sex marriages to any "person authorized to join persons in marriage" rather than to clergy only. It did not require that such refusals be based on religious beliefs. The Act also maintained the requirement for genetic counseling in marriage between first cousins of the opposite sex and expanded it to include first cousins of the same sex, despite the inability of persons of the same sex to conceive a child together.

Governor John Baldacci previously opposed allowing same-sex couples to marry, but said he was keeping an open mind.

On April 28, 2009, the Joint Committee on Judiciary endorsed the bill. The vote was 11 in favor, 2 against, and 1 recommending that the issue be sent to the voters via referendum. On April 30, the Senate approved the bill 20–15 in a preliminary vote accepting the Judiciary Committee's majority "Ought To Pass" report. That same day, senators rejected an amendment that would have sent the same-sex marriage question to voters in a referendum and passed the bill by a final vote of 21–14. On May 5, 2009, the House of Representatives passed the bill 89–58. The bill was then sent back to the Senate for a final vote on enactment. On May 6, Governor Baldacci signed the bill into law. Baldacci became the first governor in the nation to sign a same-sex marriage law. The law was due to take effect 90 days after the Legislature adjourned.

Repeal campaign

The day after Governor Baldacci signed the Act, opponents of same-sex marriage launched a campaign to repeal it through a voter referendum. The campaign was successful in placing the question on the ballot, and on November 3, 2009, it passed by a vote of 53% to 47%, repealing the law.

2012 initiative

On June 30, 2011, EqualityMaine and Gay & Lesbian Advocates & Defenders (GLAD) announced plans to place a voter initiative in support of same-sex marriage on Maine's November 2012 ballot. The title of the citizen initiative was An Act to Allow Marriage Licenses for Same-Sex Couples and Protect Religious Freedom, and the text of their proposed ballot question was:

On July 27, 2012, Secretary of State Charlie Summers released the final wording of the ballot question. The question on the November ballot read:

On January 26, 2012, supporters delivered over 105,000 petition signatures for the initiative to the Secretary of State's office, exceeding the minimum of 57,277 required signatures. The Secretary of State announced on February 23 that the office verified 85,216 signatures, qualifying it for the November 2012 ballot. The 2012 campaign to legalize marriage for same-sex couples in Maine was led by a group called Mainers United for Marriage. Several groups had also formed in opposition.

On November 6, 2012, in a reversal of the vote three years earlier, Maine became one of the first U.S. states to approve same-sex marriage through a ballot initiative and the fifth New England state to legalize same-sex marriage. The results were a reverse of those seen in the 2009 referendum, with 53 percent in favor and 47 percent opposed. Maryland and Washington voters also approved same-sex marriage the same day. The definition of marriage in the state of Maine is now the following:

Taking effect
The law took effect on December 29, 2012, 30 days after the election results were certified by Governor Paul LePage on November 29. The 29th being a Saturday, most town and city offices would not be open until Monday, December 31, to issue marriage licenses. However, Augusta and Gardiner announced that they would open with limited hours on the 29th to issue licenses. Brunswick said they would issue licenses from 9 a.m. to noon that day, but by appointment only. Portland announced that they would open City Hall at 12:01 a.m. on the 29th to issue marriage licenses and perform weddings. City spokeswoman Nicole Clegg said that City Hall would be open until 3:01, but that anyone in line before then would be given service. Additionally, Portland and other communities, who planned to be open, stated that any couple who wanted a marriage license that day would be given one, not just same-sex couples. Some municipalities, such as Farmington, Lewiston and Auburn, said they would not open on the 29th, due to little demand in those locations. Some also stated that they could not afford to open, or saw no need to open just because the law was changed.

The first same-sex couple to marry were Steven Bridges and Michael Snell, who married at Portland City Hall just after midnight at 12:25 a.m.. More than 40 same-sex couples married in Maine that Saturday, December 29, in at least 10 municipalities: Augusta, Bangor, Brewer, Brunswick, Falmouth, Freeport, Gardiner, Hallowell, Portland, and South Portland.

Native American nations
State law grants the Penobscot Nation, the Passamaquoddy Tribe, and the Houlton Band of Maliseet Indians jurisdiction over the marriages and divorces of tribal members. As a result, the state same-sex marriage law does not apply to these tribes, though tribal members may still request a marriage license from their county clerk. It is unclear if same-sex marriage is legal in these tribes.

Economic impact
A University of California, Los Angeles research study from February 2009 estimated that extending marriage to same-sex couples in Maine would have a positive impact on the state's economy and budget. The study found that same-sex weddings and associated tourism would generate $60 million in additional spending in Maine over three years, creating 1,000 new jobs. The state would see an increase of $3.6 million in revenues over the next three years, resulting from increased sales tax revenues of approximately $3.1 million and new marriage license fees of $500,000. In calculating the net benefit to the state, the study approximated that half of Maine's 4,644 same-sex couples, or 2,316 couples, would marry in the first three years that marriage is available to them. The study also estimated that approximately 15,657 same-sex couples from other states would come to Maine to marry.

Marriage statistics
In the twelve months that followed the implementation of same-sex marriage in Maine, a total of 1,530 same-sex couples had married, according to the state's Office of Data, Research and Vital Statistics. This comprised 16% of all marriages recorded in Maine in that time. Marriages between women outpaced marriages between men by a tally of 970 to 560.

Public opinion
{| class="wikitable"
|+style="font-size:100%" | Public opinion for same-sex marriage in Maine
|-
! style="width:190px;"| Poll source
! style="width:200px;"| Date(s)administered
! class=small | Samplesize
! Margin oferror
! style="width:100px;"| % support
! style="width:100px;"| % opposition
! style="width:40px;"| % no opinion
|-
| Public Religion Research Institute
| align=center| March 8–November 9, 2021
| align=center| ?
| align=center| ?
|  align=center| 75%
| align=center| 23%
| align=center| 2%
|-
| Public Religion Research Institute
| align=center| January 7–December 20, 2020
| align=center| 214 random telephoneinterviewees
| align=center| ?
|  align=center| 77%
| align=center| 22%
| align=center| 1%
|-
| Public Religion Research Institute
| align=center| April 5–December 23, 2017
| align=center| 359 random telephoneinterviewees
| align=center| ?
|  align=center| 71%
| align=center| 25%
| align=center| 4%
|-
| Public Religion Research Institute
| align=center| May 18, 2016–January 10, 2017
| align=center| 594 random telephoneinterviewees
| align=center| ?
|  align=center| 59%
| align=center| 32%
| align=center| 9%
|-
| Public Religion Research Institute
| align=center| April 29, 2015–January 7, 2016
| align=center| 460 random telephoneinterviewees
| align=center| ?
|  align=center| 56%
| align=center| 35%
| align=center| 9%
|-
| New York Times/CBS News/YouGov
| align=center| September 20–October 1, 2014
| align=center| 1,531 likely voters
| align=center| ± 2.8%
|  align=center| 63%
| align=center| 27%
| align=center| 10%
|-
| Public Religion Research Institute
| align=center| April 2, 2014–January 4, 2015
| align=center| 300
| align=center| ?
|  align=center| 63%
| align=center| 30%
| align=center| 7%
|-
| Public Policy Polling
| align=center| November 8–11, 2013
| align=center| 964 voters
| align=center| ± 3.2%
|  align=center| 54%
| align=center| 37%
| align=center| 9%
|-
| Public Policy Polling
| align=center| August 23–25, 2013
| align=center| 953 registered voters
| align=center| ± 3.2%
|  align=center| 53%
| align=center| 38%
| align=center| 9%
|-
| Public Policy Polling
| align=center| January 18–20, 2013
| align=center| 1,268 Maine voters
| align=center| ± 2.8%
|  align=center| 53%
| align=center| 43%
| align=center| 4%
|-
| Public Policy Polling
| align=center| November 1–2, 2012
| align=center| 1,633 likely voters
| align=center| ± 2.4%
|  align=center| 53%
| align=center| 42%
| align=center| 5%
|-
| Public Policy Polling
| align=center| September 17–18, 2012
| align=center| 804 likely voters
| align=center| ± 3.5%
|  align=center| 52%
| align=center| 40%
| align=center| 8%
|-
| Maine People's Resource Center
| align=center| March 31–April 2, 2012 
| align=center| 993 registered voters
| align=center| ± 3.11%
|  align=center| 58%
| align=center| 40%
| align=center| 2%
|-
| Public Policy Polling
| align=center| March 2–4, 2012
| align=center| 1,256 voters
| align=center| ± 2.8%
|  align=center| 54%
| align=center| 41%
| align=center| 5%
|-
| Public Policy Polling
| align=center| October 28–31, 2011
| align=center| 673 voters
| align=center| ± 3.8%
|  align=center| 51%
| align=center| 42%
| align=center| 8%
|-
| Goodwin Simon Strategic Research
| align=center| May 18–24, 2011
| align=center| 1,003 likely November 2012 voters
| align=center| ± 3.1%
|  align=center| 53%
| align=center| 39%
| align=center| 7%
|-
| Public Policy Polling
| align=center| March 3–6, 2011
| align=center| 1,247 voters
| align=center| ± 2.8%
|  align=center| 47%
| align=center| 45%
| align=center| 8%
|-

See also
 Domestic partnership in Maine
 LGBT rights in Maine
 Same-sex marriage in the United States

Notes

References

2012 in LGBT history
Maine
LGBT rights in Maine
2012 in Maine